Coalstoun Lakes is a national park in Queensland, Australia,  northwest of Brisbane. It features a volcano, Mount Le Brun, which has two craters that contain intermittent crater lakes. Mount Le Brun is one of the youngest volcanic formations in Australia, although it was formed more than 600,000 years ago. Coalstoun Lakes is Queensland's smallest national park. 

The lakes were named by local pioneer, Nugent Wade Brown, in 1894.   There are various theories as to the origin of the name.

 One is that Coalstoun is the corruption of an Aboriginal word Goanalganai.
 Another theory is that the name 'Coalstoun' is a corruption of the word 'Colstoun'.  Nugent Wade Brown's father, John Brown (1787–1860), emigrated to the Colony of New South Wales and established a property named Colstoun near what is now Gresford in the Hunter Valley in 1838.
 Colstoun was the ancestral home of the Brown family in Scotland.  Colstoun is located south of Edinburgh and remains in the Brown family.  According to Queensland Department of National Parks, Sport and Racing "The lakes were named after Coalstoun in Scotland by Wade Brun, manager of nearby Ban Ban Station." There is no doubt that Nugent Wade Brown and Wade Brun were the same person. His wife, Margaret Campbell-Antill, was an aunt of Major-General John Macquarie Antill .

See also

 Protected areas of Queensland

References

Coalstoun Lakes National Park, Queensland Parks and Wildlife Service. Accessed 6 September 2012.

National parks of Queensland
Volcanoes of Queensland
Volcanic crater lakes
Protected areas established in 1929
Wide Bay–Burnett